The Pakistan Fisherfolk Forum (PFF) is a non-governmental organisation based in Karachi, Pakistan which works to advance social, economic, cultural and political rights of fishermen and fishing communities in Pakistan. The body came into establishment as a social welfare organisation on 5 May 1998. Since its inception, it has gathered 25,000 volunteers; the stated objectives of the group target a wide array of issues which are directly or indirectly associated with about 4 million fishers in Pakistan. Some of these are:

 Socioeconomic and political rights of fishermen
 Bringing sustainable fishery policies
 Advocating a ban on sea trawlers
 Stopping depletion of natural resources in the sea and the use of destructive nets
 Preserving the Indus Delta from degradation
 Abolishing contract systems and bringing license systems in inland water bodies
 Supporting the release and rehabilitation of detained Pakistani fishers in Indian jails and Indian fishers in Pakistani jails
 Bringing general sustainability in the usage of water resources

See also
 Fisheries Research and Training Institute, Lahore Pakistan

References

Further reading
India-Pakistan prisoners – fishermen, POWs, and more article by Beena Sarwar on the India-Pakistan prisoners issue (first published in Aman ki Asha on Jan 11, 2012)
Mohammad Ali Shah founder of Pakistani Fisherfolk Forum
PAKISTAN: Fisherfolk Blues… briefing by Qurat Mirza for The Asian Human Rights Commission, March 23, 2012
Taking the Fish- Fishing communities lose out to big trawlers in Pakistan Action Aid, Trade Justice Campaign briefing paper

External links
 Pakistan Fisherfolk Forum - Official website

Fishing trade associations
Fishing in Pakistan
Organisations based in Karachi
Organizations established in 1998